The Samsung Wave 525, also known as the Samsung S5250 or the Samsung Wave 2, is a smartphone which was released alongside the Samsung S8530 in October 2010 as an entry level alternative. The phone was launched with a price tag of $170 (€120).

Specifications

Design 
The Samsung Wave 525 measures 109.5 x 55 x 11.9 mm (4.31 x 2.17 x 0.47 in) and weighs 100 g (3.53 oz).The phone has three color options, black, white, and pink, which is sometimes referred to as the "La Fleur" edition, which was white with pink flower patterning on the front and back of the phone. The phone has three buttons on the front, two for starting or ending a call, and one for menu navigation.

Hardware

Storage 
The phone comes equipped with 100 MB of internal storage which is upgradable via a microSD card up to 16 GB

Screen 
The screen is a WQVGA TFT LCD with 400x240 pixels resolution, 5:3 aspect ratio, ~146 ppi pixel density, and 256K colors. The screen also features a capacitive layer which allows it to be used as a touchscreen. The screen itself measures 70 x 42 mm (2.91 x 1.65 in) which gives a screen-to-body ratio of about 48.3%.

Camera 
The phone has a rear-facing 3.2 megapixel camera. However, users can adjust the photo resolution all the way down to 0.1 megapixels via software. Also within the camera software package, there is the ability to apply special effects such as Sepia, Negative image, and Black and white, along with white balance options such as Auto, Incandescent lamp, Daylight, Fluorescent lamp, and Cloudy.

Users can also record video in MP4 or 3GP with a resolution of 320x240 or 176x144 at 15 frames per second and a bitrate of ~ 500 kbit/s.

Battery 
The phone comes with a replaceable 1200 mAh Lithium Ion battery. It can be charged by the microUSB 2.0 port. Results varied, but battery offered about 14 hours of talk time and 1200 hours on standby on a full charge with a new battery.

Connectivity 
The phone is equipped with Bluetooth 3.0, Wi-Fi 4, and stereo FM radio. There is also a 3.5 mm headphone jack at the top.

Other features 
 A-GPS
 Accelerometer
 Proximity sensor
 Haptic feedback
 Music and polyphonic ringtones
 Vibration
 Flight mode
 Silent mode
 Speakerphone

Software 
The device has the built-in bada OS with TouchWiz user interface.

References 

Samsung products
Samsung mobile phones
Wave 525
Samsung smartphones
Mobile phones introduced in 2011
Discontinued smartphones